Earth Report is a 12" EP released by new wave band Faith Global on Survival Records in 1982. This was the first disc the band, comprised by multinstrumentalist Stevie Shears (formerly of Ultravox! and Cowboys International) and singer Jason Guy, released.

Guy said in 1983, the recording was a joke, and the early demos of the single were the cause they were signed by David Rome in Survival Records. The same year, they released their only album, The Same Mistakes, before ceasing to work.

Track listing

A-side
"Earth Report"

B-side
"Coded World"
"Love Seems Lost"

Personnel
Jason Guy - lead vocals
Stevie Shears - instruments
Adam Hart - guitar (B2)
Steen - bass (A1, B2)
Dave Modesty - drums (A1, B2)

References

External links
 

1982 debut EPs